The women's 1500 metres at the 2005 World Championships in Athletics was held on August 12 and 14 at the Helsinki Olympic Stadium.

Medals

Results
All times shown are in seconds.

Heats
August 12, 2005

Heat 1
 Maryam Yusuf Jamal 4:10.58 Q
 Tatyana Tomashova 4:10.74 Q
 Anna Jakubczak 4:11.28 Q
 Olga Yegorova 4:11.64 Q
 Natalia Rodríguez 4:11.82 Q
 Hind Déhiba 4:12.23
 Alesia Turava 4:14.21
 Eleonora Berlanda 4:14.54
 Konstadina Efedaki 4:15.00
 Nelya Neporadna 4:15.46
 Nancy Jebet Lagat 4:16.13
 Treniere Clement 4:16.51
 Mestawot Tadesse 4:20.20
 Nahida Touhami DNS

Heat 2
 Yuliya Fomenko 4:07.26 Q
 Gelete Burka 4:07.35 Q
 Yelena Soboleva 4:07.69 Q
 Bouchra Ghézielle 4:07.87 Q
 Carmen Douma-Hussar 4:08.73 Q
 Irina Krakoviak 4:09.11 q
 Helen Clitheroe 4:09.13 q
 Wioletta Frankiewicz 4:09.90
 Daniela Yordanova 4:11.64 (SB)
 Corina Dumbravean 4:12.35
 Maria Martins 4:14.12
 Nuria Fernández 4:14.45
 Johanna Lehtinen 4:15.44
 Trine Pilskog 4:18.63
 Sonia Lopes 4:51.29

Final
August 14, 2005

 Tatyana Tomashova 4:00.35 (SB)
 Olga Yegorova 4:01.46
 Bouchra Ghézielle 4:02.45
 Yelena Soboleva 4:02.48
 Maryam Yusuf Jamal 4:02.49
 Natalia Rodríguez 4:03.06 (SB)
 Anna Jakubczak 4:03.38 (SB)
 Gelete Burka 4:04.77 (PB)
 Carmen Douma-Hussar 4:05.08
 Helen Clitheroe 4:05.19 (SB)
 Irina Krakoviak 4:08.18
 Yuliya Fomenko DSQ

External links
Official results - IAAF.org

1500 metres
1500 metres at the World Athletics Championships
2005 in women's athletics